Samantha Prahalis (born January 23, 1990 in Commack, New York) is an American basketball player who last played for the Los Angeles Sparks of the WNBA and currently for the Sardinian team CUS Cagliari. She went to Commack High School and played collegiately for Ohio State.

USA Basketball
Prahalis was a member of the USA Women's U18 team which won the gold medal at the FIBA Americas Championship in Buenos Aires, Argentina. The event was held in July 2008, when the USA team defeated host Argentina to win the championship. Prahalis helped the team win all five games,  scoring 6.2 points per game. She was also second in assists with 17.

Prahalis continued on to the USA Women's U19 team which represented the US in the 2009 U19 World's Championship, held in Bangkok, Thailand in July and August 2009. Although the USA team lost the opening game to Spain, they went on to win their next seven games to earn a rematch against Spain in the finals, and won the game 81–71 to earn the gold medal. Prahalis scored 10.7 points per game. She was the assists leader with 34 over the nine games.

Ohio State statistics

Source

WNBA
She was selected in the first round of the 2012 WNBA Draft (6th overall) by the Phoenix Mercury. On July 18, 2013 Prahalis was waived by the Phoenix Mercury. On July 22, 2013 Prahalis was signed by the New York Liberty to a seven-day contract. She was released at the end of the contract. On April 4, 2014 Prahalis signed with the Atlanta Dream. She was released by the Dream on May 12, 2014. On June 11, 2014 Prahalis signed with the Los Angeles Sparks. She was released by the Sparks six days later.

Post-WNBA career
Prahalis signed a one-year contract with the Romanian squad ACS Sepsi SIC in Sfântu Gheorghe for the 2013–14 season. As of February 2014, she led all scorers in the Romanian women's basketball league in points per game. More recently, she has coached the Ward Melville Patriots basketball team in East Setauket, New York.

References

External links
Ohio State Buckeyes bio

1990 births
Living people
All-American college women's basketball players
American expatriate basketball people in Romania
American women's basketball players
Basketball players from New York (state)
Los Angeles Sparks players
McDonald's High School All-Americans
New York Liberty players
Ohio State Buckeyes women's basketball players
Parade High School All-Americans (girls' basketball)
People from Commack, New York
Phoenix Mercury draft picks
Phoenix Mercury players
Point guards
Shooting guards
Slovak women's basketball players